Rocket Juice & the Moon is the only album by the supergroup of the same name, formed in 2008. The group consisted of Damon Albarn, Flea, and Tony Allen.

Album history
The project was announced in mid-2008; however due to various other projects by the band members recording was repeatedly delayed. Allen had previously worked with Albarn as a drummer on the album, The Good, the Bad & the Queen. On 27 October 2011, Albarn released a statement announcing the band's name. He said that he had nothing to do with naming the band and that someone in Lagos did the sleeve design for the album and that's the name he gave it. Albarn said he is fine with the name because trying to find a name for another band is always tricky.

The band's debut album contains 18 tracks and was released on 26 March 2012. The album contains guest appearances by Erykah Badu, Hypnotic Brass Ensemble, M.anifest and many others.

Live performances
The band performed together for the first time on 29 October 2011 in London, England, as part of an Another Honest Jon's Chop Up! event as Rocketjuice and the Moon.

Track listing

Personnel
Rocket Juice & the Moon
 Damon Albarn – guitar, keyboard, vocals
 Tony Allen – drums, percussion
 Flea – bass guitar

Production
 Stephen Sedgwick – recording, engineer
 Jason Cox – recording
 John Foyle – assistant recording
 Boris Persikoff – recording (in Chicago)
 Abel Garibaldi – recording (in Paris)
 Jimi Bowman – recording (in New York)
 Mark Ernestus – mixing

Additional musicians
 Erykah Badu – vocals (on tracks 2, 16 & 20)
 Thundercat – vocals (on track 2)
 Fatoumata Diawara – vocals (on tracks 3, 6, 14 & 19)
 M.anifest – vocals (on tracks 3, 6, 7 & 16)
 M3nsa – vocals (on track 7)
 Cheick Tidiane Seck – vocals (on tracks 9 & 12)
 Hypnotic Brass Ensemble – horns (on tracks 2, 3, 14 & 18)

Other personnel
 Demola Ogunajo – artwork

References

External links
 
 
 

2012 debut albums
Albums recorded at Studio 13
Collaborative albums
Damon Albarn albums
Psychedelic funk albums
Honest Jon's Records albums
Albums produced by Damon Albarn
Supergroups (music)